"Gamblin' Man" was a 1957 hit single for skiffle artist Lonnie Donegan. It was recorded live at the London Palladium and released as a double A side along with "Puttin' On the Style". It reached No. 1 in the UK Singles Chart in June and July 1957, where it spent two weeks in this position. This was the last UK number 1 to be released on 78 rpm format only, as 7" 45rpm vinyl singles were becoming the norm by this time. The original Pye Nixa release does not exist on 7" format. 

"Gamblin' Man" was written by Woody Guthrie, who recorded it during his 1944-45 Asch recordings period when it was catalogued with an alternative title "Roving Gambler". Donegan's recording was issued with the songwriting co-credit 'Guthrie - L. Donegan' and produced by Alan Freeman and Michael Barclay.

See also
List of UK Singles Chart number ones of the 1950s

References

1957 singles
UK Singles Chart number-one singles
Songs written by Woody Guthrie
Lonnie Donegan songs
Year of song missing